Trema discolor is a species of plant in the family Cannabaceae. It is endemic to French Polynesia.

Status 
It is listed as least concern by the IUCN.

References

discolor
Flora of the Tubuai Islands
Least concern plants
Taxonomy articles created by Polbot
Plants described in 1856
Taxa named by Adolphe-Théodore Brongniart
Taxa named by Carl Ludwig Blume